Paul Tucker (born November 4, 1981) is a Canadian visual artist, and illustrator of graphic novels and webcomics.

Biography
Born in St. John's, Newfoundland, Tucker claims his fascination with comics started as a child, and stuck with him.

Education
Tucker attained his bachelor's degree in Fine Arts, at Memorial University of Newfoundland Sir Wilfred Grenfell College in Corner Brook.

Japanese travel
After university he taught English in Japan for a year. In Japan, Tucker was able to learn more about the popular illustrated comic books, known as manga.

Partial bibliography

Comic Books
 Dystopian Dream Girl
 Proof of Concept (AiT/PlanetLar)
 The Underworld Railroad (2007, Viper Comics)
Tet (2015, IDW Publishing)
 Nobody is in Control (2019)
Webcomics
 Google John Smith - a collaboration with writer Aaron Goulding, about a man named John Smith who strives to claim the top Google search result for his own name.

References

 Learn by Doing - Interview with Paul Tucker (thescope)
 Viper Comics - The Underworld Railroad
 Proof of Concept
 VOCM: First Comic Boasting Three Newfoundlanders Hits Stands Today

External links
 
 Paul Tucker at terminus1525.ca

Artists from Newfoundland and Labrador
People from St. John's, Newfoundland and Labrador
1981 births
Living people
Canadian comics artists
Canadian webcomic creators